The Solomon Islands first participated at the Olympic Games in 1984, and has sent athletes to compete in every Games of the Olympiad since then. The nation has never won an Olympic medal and never participated in the Winter Olympic Games.

To date, no athlete competing for the Solomon Islands has ever won an Olympic medal.

The National Olympic Committee for the Solomon Islands was created in 1983 and recognized by the International Olympic Committee that same year.

Medal tables

Medals by Summer Games

See also

 List of flag bearers for Solomon Islands at the Olympics
 :Category:Olympic competitors for the Solomon Islands
 Solomon Islands at the Commonwealth Games
 Solomon Islands at the Paralympics

References

External links
 
 
 

 
Olympics